The Green Party of Hungary (MZP), also known mostly by its shortened form Green Party, was the first green political party in Hungary and also in post-communist countries, formed on 19 November 1989 following the end of communism.

History
Several former active members of the Duna Kör had participated in the foundation of the party in Budapest on 19 November 1989. The first branches had already established in Debrecen (23 October) and Szeged (8 November). The national congress elected a 15-member national board and 7-member presidency (its members were including Gábor Hraskó and Erzsébet Schmuck). The MZP did not have a strong central management, two centers of power emerged (Southern Transdanubia and Cisdanubia). After the failure 1990 election, the Debrecen branch led by Árpád Kotsis left the party to establish the Regional Green Party of Hungary (MRZP). When Zoltán Medveczki became Party President in March 1993, the party gradually changed its political position from moderate to radical right-wing. The MZP adopted anti-liberal, anti-communist, anti-Semitic and pro-fascist elements to its program and also criticized privatization and market economy. Medveczki also founded and registered the party's paramilitary wing, the Alliance of National Green Youth.

Despite its green ideology, the MZP under Medveczki supported the construction and expansion of the Gabčíkovo–Nagymaros Dams. They rejected Hungary's join to the North Atlantic Treaty Organization (NATO). On 5 June 1993, critics of Medveczki's politics, quit the party and established the Green Alternative (ZA), led by György Droppa. In November 1995, Ottó Stekler also decided to left MZP to found the Hungarian Social Green Party (MSZZP). The MZP remained unsuccessful in the forthcoming elections. In 2003, the party campaigned against Hungary's against joining the European Union. Before the 2006 parliamentary election, it joined the electoral coalition of Centre Party, but did not gain any seats.

Election results

National Assembly

References

Sources

External links
Zöldpártok Magyarországon - Örök ígéretek

1989 establishments in Hungary
2011 disestablishments in Hungary
Defunct political parties in Hungary
Green conservative parties
Green political parties in Hungary
Political parties disestablished in 2011
Political parties established in 1989